April 11 - Eastern Orthodox liturgical calendar - April 13

All fixed commemorations below are observed on April 25 by Eastern Orthodox Churches on the Old Calendar.

For April 12th, Orthodox Churches on the Old Calendar commemorate the Saints listed on March 30.

Saints

 Hieromartyr Artemon the Presbyter, of Laodicea (284-305)  (see also: March 24, April 13)
 Martyrs Demas and Protion, and those with them, by beheading (285-305)
 Martyr Sabbas the Goth, at Buzău in Wallachia (372)  (see also: April 15 - Slavic)
 Saint Isaac the Syrian (Isaac of Monteluco), Abbot of Spoleto, Italy (c. 550)  (see also: April 11 - West)
 Venerable monk-martyrs David, John and Menas, of Palestine, shot by archers (after 636)
 Saint Basil the Confessor, Bishop of Parium (754)
 Venerable Anthusa of Constantinople (809)
 Venerable Athanasia the Wonderworker (Athanasia of Aegina), Abbess, of Aegina (860) (see also: April 18 - Greek)
 Saint Sergius II, Ecumenical Patriarch of Constantinople (1019)

Pre-Schism Western saints

 Saint Vissia, a virgin-martyr in Fermo near Ancona in Italy under Decius (c. 250)
 Saint Victor of Braga (São Victor), a catechumen martyred in Braga in Portugal under Diocletian, thus baptised in his own blood (c. 300)
 Saint Julius I, Pope of Rome, defended St Athanasius against his Arian accusers, and also built many churches (352)
 Hieromartyr Zeno of Verona, Bishop of Verona (371)
 Saint Constantine, the first Bishop of Gap in France (529)
 Saint Wigbert (690)
 Saint Tetricus, Abbot of St Germanus in Auxerre, then Bishop of Auxerre by popular acclamation, murdered in his sleep (707)
 Saint Damian of Pavia, Bishop of Pavia in Lombardy in Italy, who vigorously opposed Monothelitism (710)
 Saint Erkemboden, a monk at Sithin in Saint-Omer in France, later Bishop of Thérouanne (714)
 Saint Alferius, (Alpherius, Adalfericus), monk, founder of the Monastery of La Cava (1050)

Post-Schism Orthodox saints

 Saint Basil of Ryazan, Bishop of Ryazan (1295)  (see also: May 21, June 10, July 3, and July 10)
 Venerable Acacius of Kapsokalyvia Skete, Mount Athos (1730)

New martyrs and confessors

 New Hieromartyr Demetrius Rozhdestvensky, Protopresbyter of Alma-Ata (1921)
 New Hieromartyr Sergiy Krestnikov (1938)

Other commemorations

 Deposition of the Cincture (Sash) of the Most Holy Theotokos in Constantinople (942)  (see also: August 31)
 Synaxis of the Murom Icon of the Most Holy Theotokos (early 12th century)
 Synaxis of the Belinich Icon of the Most Holy Theotokos (1876)
 Venerable Neophytus the Recluse, of Cyprus, Wonderworker (1204)  (see also: January 24 - Feast day)
 Repose of Archbishop Juvenal of Vilnius, Lithuania, monk of Optina Monastery (1904)
 Proclamation of the autocephaly of the Church of Georgia (1917)

Icon gallery

Notes

References

Sources
 April 12 / April 25. Orthodox Calendar (pravoslavie.ru).
 April 25 / April 12. Holy Trinity Russian Orthodox Church (A parish of the Patriarchate of Moscow).
 April 12. OCA - The Lives of the Saints.
 The Autonomous Orthodox Metropolia of Western Europe and the Americas. St. Hilarion Calendar of Saints for the year of our Lord 2004. St. Hilarion Press (Austin, TX). p. 28.
 April 12. Latin Saints of the Orthodox Patriarchate of Rome.
 The Roman Martyrology. Transl. by the Archbishop of Baltimore. Last Edition, According to the Copy Printed at Rome in 1914. Revised Edition, with the Imprimatur of His Eminence Cardinal Gibbons. Baltimore: John Murphy Company, 1916. p. 103.
 Rev. Richard Stanton. A Menology of England and Wales, or, Brief Memorials of the Ancient British and English Saints Arranged According to the Calendar, Together with the Martyrs of the 16th and 17th Centuries. London: Burns & Oates, 1892. p. 155.
Greek Sources
 Great Synaxaristes:  12 Απριλιου. Μεγασ Συναξαριστησ.
  Συναξαριστής. 12 Απριλίου. ecclesia.gr. (H Εκκλησια Τησ Ελλαδοσ). 
Russian Sources
  25 апреля (12 апреля). Православная Энциклопедия под редакцией Патриарха Московского и всея Руси Кирилла (электронная версия). (Orthodox Encyclopedia - Pravenc.ru).
  12 апреля (ст.ст.) 25 апреля 2013 (нов. ст.). Русская Православная Церковь Отдел внешних церковных связей.

April in the Eastern Orthodox calendar